Patricia Vaurie (September 14, 1909 - March 12, 1982 ) was an American entomologist who specialized in beetles in the families Scarabaeidae and Curculionidae. She worked in the American Museum of Natural History for much of her working life.

Biography
Patricia Wilson was born in Swarthmore, Pennsylvania and grew up in New York where her family moved to. She graduated from Barnard College, Columbia University in 1931 with a degree in English literature. She joined as a volunteer and later became technical assistant in the department of insects and spiders at the American Museum of Natural History, not far from her home, and where she met Charles Vaurie, a dentist and amateur ornithologist. They married in 1934 and made many collection trips together around the world. Her works included several revisions of a wide range of groups.

Works 
Some of her major works include:
 1948 A revision of the North American Languriidae. Bull. Amer. Mus. Nat. Hist. 92:123-155.
 1950 The blister beetles of north central Mexico (Coleoptera, Meloidae). Amer. Mus. Novitates, no. 1477, pp. 1–68, figs. 1-21.
 1954 Revision of the genera Anchylorhynchus and Petalochilus of the Petalochilinae (Coleoptera, Curculionidae). Amer. Mus. Novitates, no. 1651, pp. 1–58, figs. 1-4.
 1954 New synonymy in Diplotaxis (Coleoptera, Scarabaeidae). Bull. Brooklyn Ent. Soc., vol. 49, no. 2, pp. 49–54.
 1955 Revision of the genus Trox in North America (Coleoptera, Scarabaeidae). Bull. Amer. Mus. Nat. Hist., vol. 106, pp. 1–89, figs. 1-27.
 1955 Review of the North American genus Amblycheila (Coleoptera, Cicindelidae). Amer. Mus. Novitates, no. 1724, pp. 1–26, figs. 1-11.
 1955 Review of the genus Macrosiagon in Mexico, with notes on Rhipiphorus (Coleoptera, Rhipiphoridae). Amer. Mus. Novitates, no. 1717, pp. 1–19, fig. 1.
 1955 (with Mont A. Cazier). Thirteen new species of Diplotaxis from northern Mexico (Coleoptera, Scarabaeidae). Amer. Mus. Novitates, no. 1739, pp. 1–25, figs. 1-3.
 1963 Key to Diplotaxis of Baja California (Coleoptera: Scarabaeidae). Pan-Pacific Ent. 39:67-73, figs. 1-19.
 1980 Revision of Rhodobaenus. Part 1. Species in South America (Coleoptera, Curculionidae, Rhynchophorinae). Bull. Amer. Mus. Nat. Hist., vol. 167, pp. 1–44.
 1981 Revision of Rhodobaenus. Part 2. Species in North America (Canada to Panama)  (Coleoptera, Curculionidae, Rhynchophorinae). Bull. Amer. Mus. Nat. Hist., vol. 171, pp. 117–198, figs. 1-65, 1 table.

Notes

References

External links 
 Scarab workers

1909 births
1982 deaths
American entomologists
Barnard College alumni
Women entomologists
20th-century American women scientists
20th-century American zoologists